Michalis Polynikis (born 6 November 1948 in Paphos, Cyprus) is a Cypriot politician. Between 29 February 2008 and 2 March 2010 he was the Minister of Agriculture and Environment in Cyprus.

References

Cyprus Ministers of Agriculture, Natural Resources and the Environment
Living people
1948 births
People from Paphos
21st-century Cypriot politicians